Felix Endrich (5 December 1921 – 31 January 1953) was a Swiss bobsledder who competed in the late 1940s and early 1950s. Competing in two Winter Olympics, he won the gold medal along with brakeman Fritz Waller in the two-man event at the 1948 Winter Olympics in St. Moritz.

Career
As a pilot, Endrich won four medals in the two-man event at the FIBT World Championships with two golds (1949, 1953), one silver (1947), and one bronze (1951).

Endrich was killed at the 1953 FIBT World Championships in Garmisch-Partenkirchen, West Germany during the four-man competition when the sled he was driving hurtled over a wall and crashed into a tree. He suffered a broken neck in the collision and was pronounced dead on arrival at the hospital in Garmisch-Partenkirchen. He had also won the two-man world championship a week earlier.

References

1921 births
1953 deaths
Bobsledders at the 1948 Winter Olympics
Bobsledders at the 1952 Winter Olympics
Bobsledders who died while racing
Swiss male bobsledders
Sport deaths in Germany
Olympic medalists in bobsleigh
Medalists at the 1948 Winter Olympics
Olympic gold medalists for Switzerland
20th-century Swiss people